Michael Wehlin (born 25 February 1962) is a Swedish orienteering competitor. He received silver medals in the relay at the 1985 and 1989 World Orienteering Championships with the Swedish team.

World cup
He finished 3rd overall in the Orienteering World Cup in 1986, after winner Kent Olsson and 2nd Øyvin Thon.

He finished 5th in 1988, 21st in 1990, and 11th in 1992.

References

External links
 
 Michael Wehlin at World of O Runners

1962 births
Living people
Swedish orienteers
Male orienteers
Foot orienteers
World Orienteering Championships medalists